Elf: Buddy's Musical Christmas is a 2014 American stop-motion animated Christmas musical television special produced by Warner Bros. Animation, directed by Mark Caballero and Seamus Walsh and written by Aaron Horvath, Michael Jelenic, Bob Martin and Thomas Meehan. It is based on the 2003 film Elf and the Broadway theatre musical Elf: The Musical. While Ed Asner reprises his role of Santa Claus from the film, the rest of the cast consists of Jim Parsons, Mark Hamill, Kate Micucci, Max Charles, and Rachael MacFarlane. The special premiered on December 16, 2014, on NBC.

Plot

Santa Claus narrates the story of Buddy's travels to New York City to meet his father Walter Hobbs. Along the way, his unrelenting cheer transforms the lives of everyone he meets and opens his father's eyes to the magic of the holiday.

Cast
 Jim Parsons as William "Buddy" Hobbs
 Mark Hamill as Walter Hobbs
 Kate Micucci as Jovie
 Ed Asner as Santa Claus
 Max Charles as Michael Hobbs
 Rachael MacFarlane as Emily Hobbs, Fake Santa Claus #3
 Fred Armisen as Matthews
 Gilbert Gottfried as Mr. Greenway
 Jay Leno as Fake Santa Claus #1
 Steve Higgins as Chadwick
 Matt Lauer as Mr. Sea Serpent
 Kevin Michael Richardson as Fake Santa Claus #2, Jerry Hobbs
 Kevin Shinick as Fake Santa Claus #4

Additional voices by Rachel Bloom, Larry Dorf, Rachel Ramras, and Kevin Shinick.

Reception
The special was viewed by 4.82 million viewers. Elf: Buddy's Musical Christmas received positive reviews from critics. The review-aggregation website Metacritic, which assigns a weighted average rating out of 100 top reviews from mainstream critics, calculated a score of 74 out of 100 based on 8 reviews, indicating "generally favorable reviews". Ray Rahman of Entertainment Weekly gave the special a B+, saying "Elf: Buddy's Musical Christmas probably won't become a classic, but it's a fun break from the usual standards." Brian Lowry of Variety gave the special a positive review, saying "Elf: Buddy's Musical Christmas suits the genre well, and suggests there is an alternative to simply running the sprockets off old holiday perennials. And in albeit in a minor way, that's good reason to be happy — if not all the time, at least for an hour or so." Erik Adams of The A.V. Club gave the special a B, saying "Narratively and emotionally rushed, at least Buddy's Musical Christmas smartly emphasizes its animated nature, through visual inventiveness and top-flight voice talent."

Musical numbers

Home media
Warner Home Video released Elf: Buddy's Musical Christmas on DVD and Blu-ray on November 3, 2015.

Accolades
The film was nominated for seven Annie Awards and won one for Character Design in an Animated Television/Broadcast Production

See also
 List of Christmas films
 Santa Claus in film

References

External links
 
 
 

2014 television specials
2010s American animated films
American television films
American animated short films
Animated Christmas films
Animated Christmas television specials
Christmas musicals
Christmas television specials
Elf (franchise)
Musical television films
Musical television specials
NBC television specials
New Line Cinema animated films
Warner Bros. Animation animated films
Elves in popular culture
American Christmas television specials